ARCADES is a British electronic music production duo consisting of Max Graham and Matt Thomson. They are best known for their co-writing and production of several songs on BTS albums Map of the Soul: Persona and Map of the Soul: 7. The duo have achieved album credit sales upwards of 12 million worldwide.

Background 
Thomson fronted indie punk band Parka, who had success after the release of their debut single, "Disco Dancer" through Universal Music Group. They toured Japan and Europe. Thomson moved into production and began releasing original songs under the name Harbour. Graham was working as a studio engineer in New York and met Thomson upon his return to work for James F. Reynolds in London.

The duo worked under the name Parallax briefly in 2016, when they appeared on the  E4 Reality show Stage School. They then formed a new project under the new name Digital Army and released official remixes for Kokiri, Conor Maynard, Kriss Kross Amsterdam, and Ty Dolla Sign.

ARCADES was originally formed in 2018, after their first single release "In The Air" featuring LA based singer Sarah Walk. The song was supported by YouTube channels CloudKid and Freshmixes. It gained the attention of BTS member J-Hope, who added the song to his Spotify playlist J-Hope's Jam. Their follow up single "Fragile" featuring SOFIA was released at the start of 2019 and has gained over 2 million YouTube views. 

The duo released two more songs: "Running" featuring Ryan Lawrie in 2019 followed by "Stars" featuring PRIDES in 2020.

ARCADES then co-wrote and produced two songs on the BTS album Map of the Soul: Persona, Jamais Vu and Mikrokosmos. Later in 2019 the duo received song writing credits on, New Rules, the opening track on the album The Dream Chapter: Magic by K-pop boyband TXT. The duo co wrote the song Inner Child from the 2020 BTS album, Map of the Soul: 7.

Discography

Singles

Song-writing and production credits

References 

English pop music groups
British electronic dance music groups
Musical groups established in 2018
British record production teams
Record production duos
2018 establishments in the United Kingdom